Chikau Mansale (born 13 January 1983 in Port Vila) is a Vanuatuan footballer who plays as a goalkeeper for Tupuji Imere in the Port Vila Football League and the Vanuatu national football team. He made his debut for the national team on 26 August 2007 in a 4–0 victory against Samoa.

References

1983 births
Living people
Vanuatuan footballers
Vanuatu international footballers
Association football goalkeepers
Erakor Golden Star F.C. players
2008 OFC Nations Cup players
2016 OFC Nations Cup players